is a former Japanese female speed skater. She competed at the 1988 Winter Olympics and in the 1992 Winter Olympics representing Japan.

References 

1965 births
Living people
Japanese female speed skaters
Olympic speed skaters of Japan
Speed skaters at the 1988 Winter Olympics
Speed skaters at the 1992 Winter Olympics
Sportspeople from Hokkaido
Speed skaters at the 1986 Asian Winter Games